Margaret M. Poloma (born August 27, 1943) is an American sociologist, professor, and author who is known for her research on the Pentecostal movement in American Christianity.

Poloma began her career as a sociologist with her research on two-career and child-free couples.

Early in her career she wrote a widely used text on contemporary sociological theory before shifting her research focus to the sociology of religion.

As a sociologist of religion Poloma has used her personal experiences as a charismatic Roman Catholic to launch various research projects. For over three decades Poloma has written extensively about religious experience in contemporary American society, including studies of prayer, Pentecostalism, contemporary revivals and divine healing.  Much of this work has focused on diverse Pentecostal spiritualities (i.e., denominational Pentecostal, charismatic, Third Wave, neo-Pentecostal, etc.), as reported in Charismatic Movement; The Assemblies of God at the Crossroad; Main Street Mystics; Blood and Fire (with psychologist Ralph W. Hood); and The Assemblies of God (with political scientist John C. Green).

Poloma's research on prayer (c.f., Varieties of Prayer with the renowned pollster George H. Gallup Jr.) has served as a bridge between Pentecostal spirituality and common spiritual experiences of American Christians through data collected in two national surveys. Through the use of both qualitative and quantitative measures to explore the experiential dimension of religion, Poloma was able to mine research nuggets that suggested religious experience does indeed impact human behavior.

For the past five years she has collaborated with some twenty other colleagues in the John Templeton Foundation-sponsored Flame of Love Project (www.godlyloveproject.org) to develop a model of “Godly Love” that demonstrates the dynamic process in which experiences of the divine contribute to a better understanding human benevolence.  Major findings from this research are found in Matthew T. Lee, Margaret M. Poloma, and Stephen G. Post, The Heart of Religion (Oxford University Press, 2013).

Bibliography
Contemporary sociological theory, Macmillan, 1979, 
The Assemblies of God at the crossroads: charisma and institutional dilemmas, Univ. of Tennessee Press, 1989, 
Varieties of prayer: a survey report, co-author with George Gallup, Jr., Trinity Press International, 1991, 
Main street mystics: the Toronto blessing and reviving Pentecostalism, Rowman Altamira, 2003, 
Blood and fire: Godly love in a Pentecostal emerging church, co-author with Ralph W. Hood, NYU Press, 2008, 
A Sociological Study of the Great Commandment in Pentecostalism: The Practice of Godly Love As Benevolent Service, co-author with Matthew T. Lee and Stephen G. Post, Edwin Mellen Press, 2009,

References

American sociologists
American women sociologists
Case Western Reserve University alumni
University of Akron faculty
1943 births
Living people
21st-century American women